I Entrust My Wife to You is a 1943 German comedy film directed by Kurt Hoffmann and starring Heinz Rühmann, Adina Mandlová, and Werner Fuetterer. It was shot at the Babelsberg Studios in Berlin. The film's sets were designed by the art director Willi Herrmann.

Synopsis
In order to keep an eye on his wife, who he suspects of wishing to commit adultery while he is away at an international conference, an inventor asks his friend to keep any eye on her. His wife in turn suspects that he is planning to have an affair with his secretary while he is away.

Cast

References

Bibliography

External links 
 

1943 films
Films of Nazi Germany
German comedy films
1943 comedy films
1940s German-language films
Films directed by Kurt Hoffmann
German black-and-white films
German films based on plays
Remakes of Hungarian films
Terra Film films
Films shot at Babelsberg Studios
1940s German films